Konina is a small town and commune in the Cercle of Koutiala in the Sikasso Region of southern Mali. The commune covers an area of 733 square kilometers and includes 7 villages. In the 2009 census it had a population of 14,786. The village of Konina, the administrative centre (chef-lieu) of the commune, is 78 km east of Koutiala.

References

External links
.

Communes of Sikasso Region